Akamon Entertainment is a developer and operator of social network games focused on the Latin-American and South European markets. The company offers multi-platform, multiplayer casino and traditional games with via portals, Facebook and mobile devices.

History 

Akamon was founded in July 2011 on the basis of Mundijuegos.com, a Spanish portal of traditional and casino games with more than 6 million users at that moment, growing to 23 million users and expanding to 8 countries in 2 years and a half.

The company started its expansion across Latin America and the south of Europe in 2012. In January 2012 Akamon entered the Brazilian market with the local portal Ludijogos.com. In March 2012, the company started operating in France through the local portal Mundijeux.fr.  In April 2012, Akamon announced an agreement with the Argentinean portal Taringa!, making Akamon the exclusive provider of online social games on its platform. Since its founding, the company has kept growing organically via local portals and white-label agreements with international partners (such as Spilgames, UOL, Terra, etc.) in Italy, France, Brazil, Venezuela and Argentina.

Following its multi-platform strategy, since the first launch in Facebook  in May 2014, the company has launched 21 Facebook and 2 mobile apps, aimed at offering a complete multi-device experience to its users.

In July 2012, Akamon won top prize in "Who's Got the Game"  competition for best startup in online games. The company's growth in its first complete year received recognition in the EGR Operator Awards 2012, where Akamon was awarded "Rising Star" and best "Social Bingo Product of the Year".

In December 2012, Akamon was ranked 7th in the list of Best Workplaces SMEs Spain, compiled by the research institute Great Place to Work.
For three consecutive years (2011, 2012 and 2013), Akamon has been included in the SCi Power 25 ranking by Social Casino Intelligence Magazine, including the top players of the social casino industry. 
In October 2013, Akamon was included among "Europe's 100 hottest Startups"   by Wired UK Magazine.
In October 2013, Akamon joined the Social Games Association (ISGA), the industry body that acts as the voice for the global gaming industry.

In April 2014 Akamon was recognized as one of the fastest-growing tech companies in Europe by The Next Web at Tech5 ranking

Funding 

In May 2013 Akamon closed its first round of investment at $3.6 million, with which Bonsai Venture Capital and Axon Partners Group became shareholders, joining the founders of the startup.

Games 

Akamon's portfolio of games consists of 41 multiplayer casino and traditional games, all of them with social features and can be played on multiple platforms (portal, mobile and Facebook).

Akamon's games:

 Chinchón 
 Parchís 
 Buraco 
 Domino 
 Pool 
 Tarot 
 Belote 
 Tute 
 Mus 
 Brisca
 Roulette Empires 
 Blackjack Cities 
 Poker
 Bingo Rider

Offices 

 Head Office in Barcelona (Spain)
 Development in Valencia (Spain)
 Slot Games in Tel Aviv (Israel)

References

External links 

Video game companies of Spain
Companies based in Barcelona
Video game companies established in 2011
Spanish companies established in 2011
Video game development companies